Archeological Site No. LA 54042 is a prehistoric archaeological site in Hidalgo County, New Mexico. The site was inhabited during the Animas phase (1200-1350 A.D.); some artifacts may also date from the Salado phase (1350-1450 A.D.) A small adobe structure with one to three rooms sits on the east side of the site; it is surrounded by scattered cobbles and ceramics. The structure's small size suggests that it was used as some sort of temporary building, possibly as a field house. The remainder of the site consists of dispersed lithic shards with a relatively low density.

The site was added to the National Register of Historic Places on January 23, 1993.

See also

National Register of Historic Places in Hidalgo County, New Mexico

References

Archaeological sites on the National Register of Historic Places in New Mexico
Hidalgo County, New Mexico
Adobe buildings and structures in New Mexico
National Register of Historic Places in Hidalgo County, New Mexico